The 1999 Nigerian House of Representatives elections in Bayelsa State was held on February 20, 1999, to elect members of the House of Representatives to represent Bayelsa State, Nigeria.

Overview

Summary

Results

Brass/Nembe 
PDP candidate Dieworio W. Wuku won the election, defeating other party candidates.

Ogbia 
PDP candidate Edeni Mary E. won the election, defeating other party candidates.

Sagbama/Ekeremor  
AD candidate Clement Amlie won the election, defeating other party candidates.

Southern Ijaw 
PDP candidate Foter Okoto won the election, defeating other party candidates.

Yenagoa/Kolokuna/Opokuma 
PDP candidate Mike Epengale won the election, defeating other party candidates.

References 

Bayelsa State House of Representatives elections
House of Representatives
February 1999 events in Nigeria